Stevenson Archer (February 28, 1827 – August 2, 1898) was a slave owner and U.S. Congressman from Maryland, serving the second district for four terms from 1867 to 1875. He also served in the Maryland House of Delegates and as Treasurer of Maryland.

Early life
Stevenson Archer was born at Medical Hall near Churchville, Maryland on February 28, 1827, to Pamella B. (née Hays) and Stevenson Archer. Archer's father and grandfather, John Archer, were both Congressmen from Maryland. His sister, Pamelia H. Archer, was the mother of George Earle Chamberlain, the 11th Governor of Oregon and a two term United States Senator.

Archer attended Bel Air Academy, later graduating from Princeton College in 1848. He studied law at the office of Otho Scott in Bel Air, and was admitted to the bar in 1850, commencing practice the same year.

Career
In 1851, Archer formed a partnership with Edwin Hanson Webster. In 1853, he was elected as a Whig to the Maryland House of Delegates.

In 1866, he was elected as a Democrat to the Fortieth and to the three succeeding Congresses, serving from March 4, 1867, until March 3, 1875. He was an unsuccessful candidate for renomination in 1874. In 1867, Archer was appointed as judge for a term on the Cecil County court.

Archer succeeded John S. Gittings as Treasurer of Maryland in 1886. In 1890, he was accused of embezzling $132,000 in state funds. The investigation found he had kept railroad bonds for personal use. He pled guilty to malfeasance and was sentenced to five years in the Maryland Penitentiary. In May 1894, Governor Frank Brown pardoned him.

Archer continued the practice of law in Bel Air until his death.

Personal life
Archer married Blanche Franklin of Sumner County, Tennessee in 1855. She was also known as Jane Cage Franklin. Together, they had five children.

Archer's family lived at Hazell Dell near Bel Air.

Later life and death
Archer suffered from kidney ailments since 1893. After leaving prison in May 1894, he was hospitalized. Archer died from Bright's disease on August 2, 1898, at the City Hospital in Baltimore. He is interred in the Churchville Presbyterian Church cemetery.

Footnotes

Additional source

External links

1827 births
1898 deaths
People from Churchville, Maryland
Princeton University alumni
Members of the Maryland House of Delegates
State treasurers of Maryland
Maryland Whigs
Democratic Party members of the United States House of Representatives from Maryland
19th-century American politicians